Annie Jay (born in 1957) is a French children's writer. She writes historical and fantastic novels, in which one finds many details concerning the ages in which her novels take place.

Works
Complot à Versailles, 1993, Illustrated by Christophe Durual; Hachette, 1999, 
A la poursuite d'Olympe, 1995; Hachette, 1999, 
Le trône de Cléopâtre, 1996 Illustrated by Durual; Hachette-Jeunesse, 2002, 
Fantôme en héritage, Hachette, 1997, 
A la cour du Roi-Soleil, Illustrated by Claire Le Grand, Milan, 2002, 
L'esclave de Pompéi, Hachette Jeunesse, 2004, 
Au nom du roi... Hachette Jeunesse, 2006, 
La vengeance de Marie, Hachette, 2008, 
L'inconnu de la Bastille, with Micheline Jeanjean, Hachette, 2008, 
Adélaïde, Princesse espiègle, Illustrated by Alice Dufeu, Eveil et découvertes, 2010, 
La dame aux élixirs, 2010

References

External links
Author's website
"Interview: Annie Jay sur Adélaïde, princesse espiègle: la petite fiancée à Versailles", Lirado, Mai 2010

French children's writers
French women children's writers
20th-century French women writers
21st-century French women writers
1957 births
Living people